SadatPur extension is a census town in North East district in the Indian state of Delhi.

About
 India census, Sadat Pur Gujran had a population of 42,564. Males constitute 55% of the population and females 45%. Sadat Pur Gujran has an average literacy rate of 63%, higher than the national average of 59.5%: male literacy is 72%, and female literacy is 52%. In Sadat Pur Gujran, 20% of the population is under 6 years of age. It's one of the sophisticated area of that district. However, the transport system is very poor since last two to three year because of road sewage. Further More upcoming projects such as widening of Main Road, Delhi Metro & Signature bridge makes this area a very attractive investment destination.
Sadat Pur People are mix of Rich & Middle Income. Various Residential Welfare Organization are there for welfare of people.

Sadat Pur Extension is the most sophisticated area of Karawal Nagar Constituency. Also it has many Fitness center, Restaurant, Schools and Farm houses.

References

Cities and towns in North East Delhi district